Aliaksandr Paulavich Hleb (born 1 May 1981), commonly referred to in English as Alexander Hleb, is a Belarusian former professional footballer.

Hleb's natural and preferred position is attacking midfielder or "in the hole" behind the strikers, but he was often deployed on the wing. He is known for his passing, agility and dribbling ability. A full international for Belarus since 2001, he won 80 caps for his country.

Early life
Hleb grew up in Minsk. His mother worked on a construction site while his father drove petrol tankers. His father had volunteered to help demolish houses in Ukraine made uninhabitable as the result of the Chernobyl nuclear disaster. Hleb believes this exposure to radiation caused his father's ill health. Before getting involved with football, Hleb was a keen swimmer and gymnast. His younger brother Vyacheslav is also a footballer.

Club career

VfB Stuttgart
Spotted by scouts, Alexander and his younger brother Vyacheslav were signed in 2000 by German Bundesliga side VfB Stuttgart for approximately €150,000. He made his Bundesliga debut on 5 September 2000 in an away match at 1. FC Kaiserslautern, coming on as a substitute for the last 20 minutes. Despite only making six league appearances in his first season with Stuttgart, Hleb became a regular at the club in his second season there and went on to establish himself as an important player for the team. In 2002, he was voted Belarusian Footballer of the Year.

In 2002–03, Stuttgart finished as runners-up in the Bundesliga and enjoyed a UEFA Champions League victory over Manchester United and Hleb had become established as the team's playmaker. After team manager Felix Magath left to join Bayern Munich in the summer of 2004, however, Stuttgart were not as successful under new coach Matthias Sammer, having finished the 2004–05 season in fifth place.

Arsenal

In June 2005, Hleb joined English side Arsenal for a sum which had the potential to reach €15 million, on a four-year contract. Arsène Wenger used Hleb at many different midfield positions, but he mainly played on the right wing for Arsenal. His competitive debut was made in August 2005 against Chelsea in the 2005 FA Community Shield, and then he made his league debut as a substitute against Newcastle United. Soon after, Hleb sustained a knee injury while on international duty with Belarus and was out for several months, returning to the first team squad in December, and played 60 minutes in Arsenal's final UEFA Champions League group stage match against Ajax on 7 December. By January 2006, Hleb had established himself as a first choice player and scored his first goal for Arsenal in a 7–0 win over Middlesbrough. In May, Hleb became the first ever Belarusian footballer to play in the Champions League final. He ended the season with 40 appearances and three goals.

Despite a hamstring injury, Hleb made 48 appearances in the 2006–07 season and scored three goals. In 2007–08, he was moved from the right wing and played behind Robin van Persie as a withdrawn striker. When strikers Emmanuel Adebayor and Eduardo recovered from injuries Arsène Wenger reverted to a 4–4–2 formation and Hleb returned to playing on the wing. His season was cut short after he was banned for three games by the FA after he was charged with violent conduct in an incident with Graeme Murty of Reading during their 2–0 win. Hleb admitted his offence, ending his season.

Barcelona
On 16 July 2008, a medical examination was held for the player at FC Barcelona, with his transfer completed later that day for a fee of €15 million plus an additional €2 million if Barcelona won the La Liga title in 2008–09 or 2009–10 (which they did in 2008–09, bringing his total fee to €17 million). Hleb signed a four-year contract with a buy-out clause of €90 million.

In March 2009, after featuring irregularly for the team – starting only five games in La Liga – Hleb admitted that he would readily accept an offer from Bayern Munich, if such an opportunity arose in the summer. He said, "I am right in the best years of my career and I do not want to spend those years on bench. Bayern Munich is a special club, their interest in me is a delightful honour. Bayern is among the best teams in the world."

Hleb went on to win the 2008–09 treble with Barcelona in his first season with the club. Hleb featured briefly in the Copa del Rey final but did not play when Barcelona went on to beat Manchester United 2–0 in the Champions League final.

At the end of the season, Hleb turned down the opportunity to join, on loan, eventual 2009–10 treble winners Internazionale, and chose to join former club, VfB Stuttgart, on loan.

In July 2009, Hleb returned to VfB Stuttgart on a one-year loan.
Hleb played 55 minutes in the first game of the 2009–10 Bundesliga season, away to VfL Wolfsburg, a match Stuttgart lost 2–0. Then, after playing in Stuttgart's 4–2 victory over SC Freiburg, Hleb scored his first goal for Stuttgart, during a Champions League qualifier against Timișoara in a 2–0 away win for the German side.

On 31 August 2010, Hleb returned to England by signing a season-long loan deal with Premier League club Birmingham City. An ankle injury sustained on international duty delayed his debut until 18 September, when he played 83 minutes in a 3–1 defeat at West Bromwich Albion. Three days later, he opened the scoring as Birmingham beat Milton Keynes Dons 3–1 in the League Cup. Injury disrupted his season, forcing him to miss Birmingham City's victory over Arsenal in the League Cup final. Towards the end of the season, he ruled out a return to Birmingham once his loan expired, suggesting that their style of football was not suited to him, although he wanted to remain in the Premier League, ideally at Arsenal.

On 31 August 2011, Hleb was loaned out to VfL Wolfsburg. Again, injury disrupted his stay at Wolfsburg, making only one start and three appearances as a substitute. The club confirmed he would leave at the scheduled end of the loan on 31 December 2011.

Final stages in his club career
After Hleb's contract with Barcelona was cancelled by mutual consent during the January 2012 transfer window, he signed for Russian Premier League club Krylia Sovetov Samara until the end of the season.

On 26 July 2012, Hleb signed a contract with BATE Borisov and won the 2012 Belarusian Premier League in his return season. Hleb stated before BATE's 3–1 win against Bayern Munich that he expected the great performances of his team in the Champions League could help him to earn a move abroad, with the player wanting a move to a Bundesliga club. However, he remained playing for BATE in the 2013 season.

On 4 January 2014, Hleb signed a contract with Torku Konyaspor in the Turkish Süper Lig for one-and-a-half years, with an option to extend the contract for an additional year. In February 2015, Hleb left Konyaspor for Süper Lig rivals Gençlerbirliği. Further spells at FK BATE Borisov, Krylia Sovetov Samara and Isloch Minsk Raion followed at the end of his club career.

International career

Hleb won over 20 caps for the Belarus under-21 side. He made his full international debut as a substitute in a 1–0 defeat against Wales in 2001. He scored on his second international start in a 5–2 victory over Hungary in April 2002. He scored a goal in the finals of the 2002 LG Cup, which Belarus won. 

In November 2006, former Belarusian captain Sergei Gurenko strongly criticised Hleb for not working hard in national team settings. Hleb, however, rejected any suggestion that he was a "prima donna". In August 2007, new national team manager Bernd Stange made Hleb team captain despite the criticism. On 22 August, Hleb wore the captain's armband for the first time in a 2–1 win against Israel. He was part of the team at the victorious friendly Malta International Football Tournament in 2008. Overall he won 80 caps.

Miscellaneous
Hleb was called "Zauberlehrling" or "Sorcerer's Apprentice" for his silky skills and dazzling tricks in Germany when he played in the Bundesliga.

Personal life
In 2003, Hleb was involved in a car crash in Minsk, after which a passenger in the other car died in hospital. Hleb was cleared of any responsibility for the accident.

While playing for Arsenal, Hleb lived in Hampstead, North London. In a 2009 interview with The Guardian newspaper, Hleb confessed that the biggest regret of his life was leaving Arsenal for Barcelona.

Hleb was married to Anastasia Kosenkova, ex-singer of the Belarusian pop group Topless, from 2008 until 2014. In summer 2016, he married Sviatlana. His first child, a daughter, was born in December of that year. Sviatlana's daughter from a previous marriage lives with the couple.

Career statistics

Club

International
Scores and results list Belarus goal tally first, score column indicates score after each Hleb goal.

Honours
BATE Borisov
Belarusian Premier League: 1999, 2012, 2013, 2015, 2016, 2018

VfB Stuttgart
UEFA Intertoto Cup: 2002

Arsenal
UEFA Champions League runner-up: 2005–06
Football League Cup runner-up: 2006–07

Barcelona
La Liga: 2008–09
Copa del Rey: 2008–09
UEFA Champions League: 2008–09

Birmingham City
Football League Cup: 2010–11

Individual
Belarusian Footballer of the Year: 2002, 2003, 2005, 2006, 2007, 2008
Arsenal Player of the Month: August 2005
kicker Team of the Year: 2004–05

References

External links

 
 
 
 
 

1981 births
Living people
Footballers from Minsk
Belarusian footballers
Belarusian expatriate footballers
Association football midfielders
Belarus international footballers
FC Dinamo-Juni Minsk players
FC BATE Borisov players
VfB Stuttgart II players
VfB Stuttgart players
Arsenal F.C. players
FC Barcelona players
Birmingham City F.C. players
VfL Wolfsburg players
PFC Krylia Sovetov Samara players
Konyaspor footballers
Gençlerbirliği S.K. footballers
FC Isloch Minsk Raion players
Belarusian Premier League players
Premier League players
Bundesliga players
La Liga players
Russian Premier League players
Süper Lig players
Expatriate footballers in Germany
Expatriate footballers in England
Expatriate footballers in Spain
Expatriate footballers in Russia
Expatriate footballers in Turkey
Belarusian expatriate sportspeople in Germany
Belarusian expatriate sportspeople in England
Belarusian expatriate sportspeople in Spain
Belarusian expatriate sportspeople in Russia
Belarusian expatriate sportspeople in Turkey